Glenn Turner (born 5 January 1964) is an Australian bobsledder. He competed in the two man event at the 1992 Winter Olympics.

References

External links
 
 
 

1964 births
Living people
Australian male bobsledders
Olympic bobsledders of Australia
Bobsledders at the 1992 Winter Olympics
Sportspeople from Sydney